Wind Echoing in My Being is a 1997 South Korean short film directed by Jeon Soo-il. It was screened in the Un Certain Regard section at the 1997 Cannes Film Festival.

Cast
 Choi Hu-gon as Crazy man
 Cho Jae-hyun as Young man
 Kim Myung-gon as Tramp
 Kim Myung-jo as Young girl
 Lee Choong-in as Child

References

External links

1997 films
1990s Korean-language films
1997 short films
Films directed by Jeon Soo-il
South Korean black-and-white films
South Korean short films
South Korean drama films